ACG Air Cargo Global was a Slovak cargo airline based at Bratislava Airport which operated charter flights and some scheduled services. The airline ceased operations at the beginning of 2020.

History 
ACG Air Cargo Global was co-founded in 2013 by Slovakian tycoon Igor Bondarenko and former Aeroflot-Cargo CEO Andrey Goryashko, with Bondarenko holding a majority share. Its livery and fleet were inherited from predecessor Air Cargo Germany, which ceased operations earlier in April 2013.

ACG's first commercial flight was a UNICEF charter on 26 August 2014, carrying 100 tons of medicines and medical equipment between Billund, Denmark and Monrovia, Liberia A twice-weekly service between Oslo and Tianjin began in January 2019 to carry Norwegian seafood to China.

None of the airline's three Boeing 747-400Fs have flown since December 2019. This has led to speculation from aviation news sites that the company had ceased operations; ACG subsequently issued a statement in March 2020 announcing that while they had not completely shut down, they had decided to restructure the company and close their office in Frankfurt. ACG employees were allegedly laid off in February 2020 – additionally, ACG's website remains inactive and all three 747-400Fs were in service with other airlines as of October 2020.

Fleet

ACG operated four Boeing 747-400Fs throughout its lifetime.

Incidents and accidents 

 On 13 November 2019, Boeing 747-400F OM-ACG operating from Liège to Tel Aviv suffered a blown tyre upon landing. There were no fatalities but there was damage to the fuselage.

References 

Defunct airlines of Slovakia
Airlines established in 2013
Airlines disestablished in 2020
Defunct cargo airlines